A "manager of managers fund" (MoM fund) is an investment fund that uses an investment strategy of directly selecting different investment managers and gives them mandate to make investment decisions. This is different from the traditional mutual fund where only one manager invests the fund capital in stock, bond (finance) or other investment vehicles. MoM fund is one type of multi-manager investment.  The other type is fund of funds.  

The assumption underpinning MoM is that diversification and balance can be achieved more readily by having a group of specialists, instead of one individual, investing the fund's capital.   This means that the role of the manager of managers is to assemble a group of investment experts, closely monitor their performance, and alter the composition of the team to adapt to market conditions or fund performance.   For example, the manager of a large pension fund would appoint different investment managers for different asset classes such as equities (stocks), bonds, and commodities.  The performance of those managers will then be measured against their respective benchmarks, replacing as necessary to maintain the fund’s overall performance and risk control measures.

See also
Collective investment schemes
Investment management
Fund of funds

Investment management
Investment funds